Château d'Eyliac is a château in Dordogne, Aquitaine, France.

Châteaux in Dordogne